The Copa do Brasil 1994 was the 6th staging of the Copa do Brasil.

The competition started on February 18, 1994, and concluded on August 10, 1994, with the second leg of the final, held at the Estádio Olímpico Monumental in Porto Alegre, in which Grêmio lifted the trophy for the second time with a 1-0 victory over Ceará.

Paulinho McLaren, of Internacional, with 6 goals, was the competition's topscorer.

Format
The competition was disputed by 32 clubs in a knock-out format where all rounds were played in two legs and the away goals rule was used.

Participating teams

Competition stages

References
 Copa do Brasil 1994 at RSSSF

1994
1994 in Brazilian football
1994 domestic association football cups